Steven Alan Soper is an American biomedical engineer who currently serves as the director of the NIH-funded, Center of BioModular Multiscale Systems for Precision Medicine (CBMM). He has served as a professor at the Universities of North Carolina – Chapel Hill, Louisiana State University and is currently a Foundation Distinguished Professor in Mechanical engineering, Chemistry, and Bioengineering at the University of Kansas. He also holds adjunct positions in the Department of Cancer Biology (University of Kansas Medical Center) and the Department of Biomedical Engineering at Ulsan National Institute of Science and Technology (Ulsan, S. Korea). He is the founder of the biotechnology company, BioFluidica, Inc.

Awards and honors 
Fellow status in AAAS (2009), the Royal Society of Chemistry and the Society for Applied Spectroscopy; the ACS Award in Advances in Chemical Instrumentation; the A.A. Benedetti-Pilcher International Microchemical Award; the Whitaker Foundation Award; the National Institutes of Health Shannon Award; and the R&D 100 Award. Soper has received both the Ralph Adams International Award in Bioanalytical Chemistry and the Irvin Youngberg Award in Applied Sciences (2021, 2022). He was also awarded the Charles E. Coates Award for Outstanding Contributions to Chemical/Engineering Research in Louisiana (2001), and the Distinguished Faculty Award while at Louisiana State University (2004).

Selected publications
Capture and Enumeration of Circulating Tumor Cells from Peripheral Blood using Microfluidics, A.A. Adams, P. Okagbare, J. Feng, R.L. McCarley, M.C. Murphy and S.A. Soper, J. Am. Chem. Soc. 130 (2008) 8633–8641.
Discrete Microfluidics for the Isolation of Circulating Tumor Cell Subpopulations Targeting Fibroblast Activation Protein Alpha and Epithelial Cell Adhesion Molecule, M.A. Witek, R.D. Aufforth, H. Wang, J. Kamande, J.M. Jackson, S. Pullagurla, M. Hupert, J. Usary, W. Wysham, D. Hilliard, S. Montgomery, V. Bae-Jump, L. Carey, P. Gehrig, M. Milowsky, C. Perou, J. Soper, Y. Whang. J.J. Yeh, G. Martin and S.A. Soper, Nature Precision Oncology 1 (2017) 24.
Isolation of Circulating Plasma Cells from Blood of Patients Diagnosed with Clonal Plasma Cell Disorder using Cell Selection Microfluidics, S.A. Soper, J. Kamande, M. Lindell, M. Witek and P. Voorhees, Integr. Biol. 10 (2018) 82 – 91.
SMARTChips: Modular Fluidic Systems for the Analysis of Circulating Tumor Cells, Thilanga N. Pahattuge, Ian M. Freed, Mateusz L. Hupert, Swarnagowri Vaidyanathan, Katie Childers, Malgorzata A. Witek, Kumuditha Weerakoon-Ratnayake, Daniel Park, Anup Kasi, Mazin F Al-Kasspooles, Michael C. Murphy, and Steven A. Soper, ACS Sensors 6 (2021) 1831–1839.
Solid-Phase XRN1 Reactions for RNA Cleavage: Application in Single-Molecule Sequencing, Uditha S. Athapattu, Charuni A. Amarasekara, Aaron C. Nagel, Francis Barany, and Steven A. Soper, Nucleic Acids Research 49 (2021) 1–15.
Analytical Technologies for Liquid Biopsy of Subcellular Materials, Camila D.M. Campos, Katie Childers, Sachindra S.T. Gamage, Harshani Wijerathne, Zheng Zhao, and Steven A. Soper, Annual Reviews of Analytical Chemistry 12 (2021) 207–229.
Label-Free Identification of Single Mononucleotides by Nanoscale Electrophoresis, Junseo Choi, Zheng Jia, Ramin Riahipour, Collin J. McKinney, Charuni A. Amarasekara, Kumuditha M. Weerakoon-Ratnayake, Steven A. Soper and Sunggook Park, Small 17 (2021) 2102567.
Affinity Selection and Enumeration of Intact SARS-CoV-2 Viral Particles from Saliva, Sachindra S. T. Gamage, Swarnagowri Vaidyanathan, Thilanga Pahattuge, Uditha S. Athapattu, Katie Childers, Lulu Zhang, Zheng Zhao, Junseo Choi, Sunggook Park, Mateusz L. Hupert, Rolf M. Muller, Judy Muller-Cohn, Brian V. Geisbrecht, Harsh Pathak, Ziyan Pessetto, Gregory Gan, Andrew K. Godwin, Malgorzata A. Witek, and Steven A. Soper, Science Advances 8 (2022) eabn9665.

References

External links 

University of North Carolina at Chapel Hill faculty
Louisiana State University faculty
University of Kansas faculty